Charlotte Esau (born July 29, 1961) is an American politician serving as the Kansas State Representative for the 14th district since 2019. A member of the Republican Party, her district is located in the center of Johnson County and currently covers north central Olathe and most of central Lenexa; after redistricting for population changes from the 2020 Census, it will cover the north central and northwestern part of Olathe. She was elected in 2018 to succeed her husband, Keith Esau, who ran for Secretary of State of Kansas.

Committee assignments
Committee assignments in the Kansas House of Representatives 2019–2022:
Children and Seniors, Vice Chair (member 2019-20, vice chair 2021-2022)
Transportation and Public Safety Budget (2019-2022)
Energy, Utilities, and Telecommunications (2021-2022)
Redistricting (2021-2022)
Joint Committee on Child Welfare Oversight (2021-2022)
Kansas Senior Care Task Force (2021-2022)
Local Government (2019-2020)

References

Living people
1961 births
Republican Party members of the Kansas House of Representatives
21st-century American politicians
21st-century American women politicians
Women state legislators in Kansas
Politicians from Olathe, Kansas
Spouses of Kansas politicians